, abbreviated as , is a Japanese manga series written and illustrated by Masakazu Ishiguro. The manga ran in the monthly magazine Young King OURs from March 2005 to October 2016, and was collected into sixteen bound volumes. The series follows the exploits of whiny Hotori Arashiyama, her friends, family, neighbors, shopkeepers and colleagues at the local maid café. The slice of life format is occasionally interspersed with stories dealing with aliens, ghosts and the paranormal.

An anime television series adaptation by Shaft was broadcast from October to December 2010. The manga was first licensed by Crunchyroll; in 2020 it was also licensed by Manga Planet with the name SoreMachi: And Yet the Town Moves.

In 2018, And Yet the Town Moves won the 49th Seiun Award for the Best Comic category, as well as the Excellence Award at the 17th Japan Media Arts Festival in 2013.

Plot
Hotori Arashiyama is a high school girl who works part-time as a waitress at Seaside coffee shop in the Maruko shopping district. One day, the owner, Uki Isobata, comes up with a secret plan to make the restaurant prosperous. It was to turn Seaside into a popular maid café. However, none of the people involved knew about maid cafes, and under the simple idea that if the waitresses wore maid clothes, it would be a maid cafe, and Seaside restarted as a maid cafe.

Characters

Main characters

Hotori is the clumsy, whiny and happy-go-lucky but mostly good-natured and well-meaning main protagonist of the series. Arguably the most well-known girl in town, she is very knowledgeable of all there is worth knowing about in their community. Possessing a face of childlike innocence, older townsfolk treat Hotori as a granddaughter while toddlers are effortlessly amused much to her annoyance. She is a huge fan of detective fiction and mystery novels; her deep dislike of mathematics stems from her belief that it offers little value for aspiring detectives such as herself. These unusual interests put her at odds against her math teacher (she has good grades in all her other subjects) and the town's patrolling police officer (she has vigilante tendencies). After being reminded by the Maid Seaside Café owner of all the free curry meals she enjoyed there as a child, Hotori began working part-time in the restaurant. Having almost non-existent cooking skills coupled with her lack of female charisma, Hotori is relegated into cleaning duties and running errands. Despite her limitations, she is very earnest in her work and genuinely wants to help not only the elderly proprietress but also the shopping district as a whole.

Toshiko is the pretty and well-endowed friend of Hotori. She decided to work in the same café when she discovered that her crush, their classmate Hiroyuki Sanada, is the lone regular customer. Her superb culinary talents and irresistible feminine charm instantly make her an indispensable asset for Maid Seaside Cafe; she has the desirable qualities of a maid that proprietress Uki Isohata has not found in Hotori. Toshiko's only failing is that her lack of humility more often than not manifests into arrogance. Even if her brutally frank personality often clashes against Hotori's immature antics, they are still very close friends. She disapproves of Hotori's childish habit of nicknaming her "Tattsun" (sometimes extended even further into "Tattsun-tsun"), but later relents when the moniker catches on and everyone else begins using it.

Hotori's childhood friend and classmate. As the only child of a widowed fish merchant, Hiroyuki helps out often at their shop; he is quite skilled in preparing and cooking seafood. Being raised alone by a rarely affectionate father who was also known as a local troublemaker, they act more like siblings in a love-hate relationship. With his teen-idol good looks and congeniality, Toshiko is very enamored of him. But Hiroyuki hardly notices her advances because of his longtime secret crush on his childhood friend. Whenever he is alone with Hotori, he often fantasizes scenarios wherein he is able to muster enough courage to finally confess his feelings for her.

Proprietress and head maid of the Maid Seaside Café, Uki took over the ownership of the restaurant after her husband died more than a decade earlier. To keep up with the current trend of the present generation, she converted her curry shop into a maid-themed cafe. Business started slow because the restaurant was severely understaffed with just her doing the cooking and Hotori waiting on the tables. Though they are unrelated, Hotori has known her for a long time and lovingly calls her "Granny". Although somewhat tyrannical at times, Uki genuinely cares for the well-being of others and is a well-respected elder in their community. Aside from her troublesome spine, she appears to be in good health and is still quite outgoing for someone her age.

Buck-toothed classmate of Hotori and table-tennis ace.

Oya High School mathematics teacher. He is also Hotori's homeroom teacher and sees her as one of his two nemeses (the other being his own math teacher from childhood). Hotori has a crush on him.

Initially mistaken as a younger boy by Hotori due to her short hair and slight build, she is in fact an upperclassman at Oya High School and the most laid-back member of its ping-pong club. Despite her seemingly uncaring personality and non-conformist nature, she is unexpectedly devoted to her parents and a good friend especially towards Hotori. Futaba plays bass guitar and is a cat-lover.

Arashiyama household

Hotori's father.

Hotori's mother.

Hotori's younger brother. 7 years younger than Hotori.

Hotori's sister and youngest member of the family. 3 years younger than Takeru. Also likes detective stories and has good investigative skills herself.

The Arashiyama family's pet dog, resembling a Japanese raccoon dog. In the anime, she ends all of her sentences with "poko".

Townspeople

Hotori's arch-nemesis, the local police officer.

Fishmonger and father to Hiroyuki.

Owner of the grocery store and frequent visitor to the café.

Owner of the laundry and frequent visitor to the café.

Clumsy owner of the local antique shop.

Tsundere classmate of Takeru, whom she has a crush on. Her nickname is "Ebi-chan".

Media

Manga
The manga ran in Shōnen Gahōsha's monthly magazine Young King OURs from March 30, 2005, to October 28, 2016, and was collected into sixteen bound volumes in Japan. 
It was originally published in English through JManga, but later it was simulpublished online by Crunchyroll and is available on their site. BookWalker released the first ten English digital book volumes for purchase as well. In 2020, it was also licensed by Manga Planet under the name SoreMachi: And Yet the Town Moves.

Chapters not in volume format
These chapters have not been collected into volumes. They were published in issues of Young King Ours in May 2009 and November 2015. They can be found in the Soremachi Official Guide Book which was released after the final volume was released.
53. 
128.

Anime
Soredemo Machi wa Mawatteiru has been adapted into a 12-episode anime series that started airing on October 8, 2010. The anime is chief directed by Akiyuki Shinbo, with assistant direction by Naoyuki Tatsuwa, and produced by Shaft. J-pop band Round Table composed the music, Katsuhiko Takayama acted as series composition writer, and Hiroki Yamamura (Studio Pastoral) designed the characters. Yamamura, Yasutoshi Iwasaki, and Miyako Nishida (NEOX) served as chief animation directors. Half of the series was outsourced outside of Shaft: episodes 3 and 6 to Magic Bus; episodes 4 and 10 to Studio Pastoral; episode 8 to Doga Kobo; and episode 11 to Diomedéa.

The first Blu-ray/DVD of the series was released in Japan on December 24, 2010. The CD of Down Town was released in Japan on October 20, 2010, and the CD of Maids Sanjou! was released on November 24, 2010. At Anime Weekend Atlanta 2011, Sentai Filmworks announced that they have licensed the anime and release the series in 2012.

Episode list

Reception
On Kadokawa Media Factory's Da Vinci magazine "Book of the Year" list, the manga ranked 44th in the 2017 list. On Takarajimasha's Kono Manga ga Sugoi! ranking of top manga of 2018 for male readers, the manga ranked 20th. The manga was nominated for the 22nd Tezuka Osamu Cultural Prize in 2018.

And Yet the Town Moves was awarded the 49th Seiun Award for Best Comic category in 2018. The manga was also awarded the Excellence Award for the 17th Japan Media Arts Festival in 2013 in the Manga Division where the jury described the manga as one that can convey drama, happy daily lives and connection with people without depicting any dramatic or personal traumatic incidents. The jury members highly valued the work's realization of the “pursuit of cheerfulness”, which they described as heliotropism, comparing it to works by Fujiko F. Fujio and Tetsuya Chiba, providing entertaining episodes with "high level contents every installment".

See also
Heavenly Delusion, another manga series by the same author

Notes

References

External links
 Anime Official Site - Tokyo Broadcasting System 
 

2005 manga
2010 anime television series debuts
2010 Japanese television series endings
Comedy anime and manga
Seinen manga
Sentai Filmworks
Shaft (company)
Shōnen Gahōsha manga
Slice of life anime and manga
TBS Television (Japan) original programming